Impossible Figures and Other Stories I is a 2021 Polish and Canadian short film and the third (but chronologically first) chapter of a trilogy of animated stories written and directed by Polish filmmaker Marta Pajek. The film has been critically acclaimed and featured in several festivals, such as Linoleum Festival, DOK Leipzig and the Paris International Animation Film Festival. The film qualifed for the 95th Academy Awards in the eligible films under the category Best Animated Short Film, but was not selected as one of the final five nominees.

Plot 
An older woman explores the labyrinthine streets of a deserted city. During the walk, she recalls the memories of her loved ones in a melancholic monologue.

Reception 
Since its release, the film has been selected in various festivals and academies around the world:

References

External links 
 Official Trailer on Vimeo.
 Impossible Figures and Other Stories I at IMDb.

2022 films
2022 short films
Canadian animated short films
Polish animated short films